The Bavarian Pts 3/4  steam locomotives of the Royal Bavarian State Railways (Königlich Bayerische Staatsbahn) were employed on the steam 'tramway' between Altötting and Neuötting. A total of four machines were built, nos. 1101, 1102 and 1103 in 1906 and no. 1104 not until the retirement of no. 1102 in 1922. They had a covered driving gear, a high boiler with water tanks located beneath it, gangways and a railing for the running plate.

After the foundation of the Deutsche Reichsbahn the remaining three locomotives were taken over and grouped into DRG Class 99.13. They were given the numbers 99 131 - 99 133. The locos were only used as reserve engines after the closure of the route in 1930 and retired in 1931. Number 99 133 (ex no. 1104, factory no. 7986), however, found a new job on the Wallersdorf – Münchshöfen branch line where it worked from 1938 to the closure of the line in 1949. It was then scrapped.

See also 
 List of Bavarian locomotives and railbuses
 Bavarian branch lines

References 

 
 

2-6-0T locomotives
Pts 4 4
Metre gauge steam locomotives
Railway locomotives introduced in 1906
1′C h2t locomotives
Freight locomotives